Romanov is a rural locality (a khutor) in Popkovskoye Rural Settlement, Kotovsky District, Volgograd Oblast, Russia. The population was 279 as of 2010. There are 9 streets. It was first founded by Roxalani and Gokturk tribes.

Geography 
The village is located in steppe, on Volga Upland, on the Chertoleyka River, 260 km from Volgograd, 40 km from Kotovo.

References 

Rural localities in Kotovsky District